The 1969 Sugar Bowl was the 35th edition of the college football bowl game, played at Tulane Stadium in New Orleans, Louisiana, on Wednesday, January 1. It featured the fourth-ranked Georgia Bulldogs of the Southeastern Conference (SEC), and the #9 Arkansas Razorbacks of the Southwest Conference (SWC).

Underdog Arkansas won 16–2, and split end Chuck Dicus was named the outstanding player after catching twelve passes.

Teams

Arkansas

Guard Jim Barnes was a consensus All-American for the Razorbacks in 1968. Bill Burnett's 16 touchdowns scored tied him for eighth-most points scored nationally. The Hogs lost only once, to the #17 Texas Longhorns, 39–29. The Razorbacks and Longhorns thusly shared the Southwest Conference crown for 1968, but Texas received the bid to the Cotton Bowl based upon the head-to-head victory.

Georgia

Vince Dooley's Georgia Bulldogs went 8–0–2 and won the SEC, only tying Tennessee and Houston. The Bulldogs' ferocious defense was anchored by consensus All-American end Bill Stanfill.

Game summary
Georgia's number-one ranked defense matched up against the ninth-ranked offense of Arkansas on New Year's Day in New Orleans. The first game of a major bowl tripleheader (Rose, Orange) on NBC, it kicked off at 1 pm CST.

The first quarter was scoreless; in the second, Arkansas quarterback Bill Montgomery threw a 27-yard touchdown pass to Chuck Dicus, but Georgia got a safety to pull within 7–2. Arkansas kicker Bob White made a 34-yard field goal and the Razorbacks led 10–2 at halftime. After a scoreless third quarter, White kicked field goals of 24 and 31 yards in the fourth quarter to seal the Arkansas win at 16–2.

The game had twenty punts (ten each) and eleven turnovers (eight by Georgia).

Statistics
{| class=wikitable style="text-align:center"
! Statistics !! Arkansas !!  Georgia 
|-
|First downs||13||13
|-
|Rushing||41–40||47–75
|-
|Passing||17–39–1||11–31–3
|-
|Passing yards||185||117
|-
|Total offense||80–225||78–192
|-
|Punts–avg.||10–33.6||10–38.5
|-
|Fumbles–lost||4–2||5–5
|-
|Turnovers||3||8
|-
|Penalties–yards||4–31||4–25
|}

Aftermath
After twelve years, this was the last Sugar Bowl on NBC; it returned to ABC in January 1970.

Arkansas returned to the Sugar Bowl the following year; Georgia's next major bowl was seven years later in the Cotton Bowl, also against Arkansas, and returned to the Sugar Bowl the following year.

References

Sugar Bowl
Sugar Bowl
Arkansas Razorbacks football bowl games
Georgia Bulldogs football bowl games
Sugar Bowl
Sugar Bowl